{{Infobox company
|name = Incinerator Studios
|logo = IncineratorStudios.png
|type = Private
|foundation = 2005
|location = Carlsbad, California
|fate = Defunct
|defunct = 2017
|successor = Playdek
|industry = Software & programming
|products = CarsCars Mater-National ChampionshipMX vs. ATV: UntamedSpongeBob SquarePants featuring Nicktoons: Globs of Doom'|homepage = 
}}Incinerator Studios''' was an American video game developer, based in Carlsbad, California, known for developing several racing games, three based on the animated film franchise Cars and one MX vs. ATV game, with all four of them featuring other versions developed by the more experienced racing developer Rainbow Studios.  Incinerator Studios, like Rainbow Studios, was a wholly owned subsidiary of THQ, but it was spun off as an independent company in March 2009 as part of a cost-cutting move. In 2011, Incinerator launched a new company, Playdek, focused on developing mobile tabletop games.

Their website as of 2017 is defunct and most likely the company is defunct.

Games developedCars - Wii (2006)Cars Mater-National Championship - Wii, PS3 (2007)MX vs. ATV Untamed - Wii, PS2 (2007)Nicktoons: Globs of Doom - Wii, PS2 (2008)Cars Race-O-Rama - Wii, PS3, X360, PS2 (2009)Star Raiders'' - PS3, X360, PC (2011)

References

Defunct video game companies of the United States
Video game companies based in California
Video game development companies
Companies based in Carlsbad, California
Video game companies established in 2005
Video game companies disestablished in 2017
2005 establishments in California
2017 disestablishments in California
Defunct companies based in California